Question Team is a British television comedy panel show presented by Richard Ayoade. The show features three different comedian guests each episode, who each present a round of their own questions. Question Team was first broadcast on Dave on 12 October 2021, with episodes airing at 10pm on Tuesdays for the first series, and at 10pm on Mondays for the second.

Accompanying the release of the second season was a YouTube series called Question Team: Interrogations. Comedians Abi Clarke and Huge Davies interrogated the soon-to-be Question Team guests on their chosen topic before their appearance on the show.

Format 
Question Team flips the traditional panel show format by inviting each of the three comedian guests to bring their own round of questions about their own chosen specialist topic. The other two guests, as well as Ayoade, must answer these questions—which often involve the utilization of props, people, and/or the large in-studio screen. Each episode features three comedians, but after each has presented their round, Ayoade outsources his round to be presented by a fourth comedian. The comedians' chosen topics of interest range greatly, from topics like lip reading to conspiracy theories.

Rounds are out of up to 5 points, and the winner at the end of each episode receives a mystery prize in a manila envelope, and a Question Team-branded bomber jacket and reusable coffee cup (in Series 1) or tote bag (in Series 2).

Episodes

Series 1 (2021)

Series 2 (2022)

References

External links 
 
 
 
 

2021 British television series debuts
2022 British television series endings
2020s British game shows
British panel games
Dave (TV channel) original programming
English-language television shows